Prezzo is a frazione of the commune of Pieve di Bono-Prezzo, in Trentino, northern Italy, located about  southwest of Trento.  

Former municipalities of Trentino